Stomp: The Best of the Brothers Johnson is a compilation album by The Brothers Johnson, released in 2013.

Critical reception
Andy Kellman of Allmusic.com found this to be the best compilation of the group's work: "Going back to 1987's Classics, Vol. 11, there has been a handful of decent single-disc Brothers Johnson anthologies. Through 2012, the group still lacked a double-disc compilation to do proper justice to its catalog. A couple minor issues aside, Stomp: The Best of the Brothers Johnson -- released through Universal U.K.'s Spectrum division in 2013 -- is an ideal overview."

Track listing

Disc one
"Get the Funk Out Ma Face" (George Johnson, Louis Johnson, Quincy Jones) – 6:00
"I'll Be Good to You" (George Johnson, Louis Johnson, Senora Sam) – 4:46
"Free and Single" (George Johnson, Louis Johnson) – 4:09
"Land of Ladies" (George Johnson, Henry George Johnson, Louis Johnson) – 4:32
"Right On Time" (Henry George Johnson, Louis E. Johnson, Quincy Jones) – 3:38
"Free Yourself, Be Yourself" (George Hanry Johnson, Louis E. Johnson) – 4:13
"Love Is" (Henry George Johnson, Louis E. Johnson, Peggy Ann Jones, Quincy Jones) – 4:21
"Ain't We Funkin' Now" (Tom Bahler, Louis Johnson, Valerie Johnson, Quincy Jones, Alex Weir) – 5:39
"Ride-O-Rocket" (Nickolas Ashford, Valerie Simpson) – 4:42
"Street Wave" (Alex Mckay Weir, Louis E. Johnson, Jerome R. Hey, Wayne Lee Vaughn) – 5:07
"Mista' Cool" (Ed Eckstine, Louis Johnson, Larry Williams) – 3:29
"Blam" (Tom Bahler, David W. Foster, Henry George Johnson, Louis E. Johnson, Quincy Jones, Alex Mckay Weir) – 4:55
"Closer to the One That You Love" (Henry George Johnson, Louis E. Johnson, Rod Temperton) - 3:12
"Thunder Thumbs and Lightnin' Licks" (Dave Grusin, George Johnson, Louis Johnson, Paul Riser) - 4:51
"Runnin' for Your Lovin'" (George Johnson, Louis Johnson) - 5:06
"Strawberry Letter 23" (Shuggie Otis) - 5:02

Disc Two
"Stomp!" (George Johnson, Louis Johnson, Valerie Johnson, Rod Temperton) – 6:00
"Light Up the Night" (George Johnson, Louis Johnson, Rod Temperton) – 3:48
"Treasure" (Rod Temperton) – 4:11
"Smilin' On Ya" (Louis Johnson, Jerry Hey, Gregory Arthur Phillinganes, Arthur Bergh, Jerome R. Hey) – 3:42
"The Real Thing" (George Johnson, Louis Johnson) – 3:54
"Teaser" (Henry George Johnson) - 3:49
"Welcome to the Club" (Louis Johnson, Valerie Johnson) – 4:31
"Funk It (Funkadelala)" (Louis Johnson, Valerie Johnson) – 4:08
"I'm Giving You All Of My Love" (Henry George Johnson, Eddie Noble) – 4:46
"The Great Awakening" (Henry George Johnson, John Sculler) – 5:31
"P.O. Box 2000 (Instrumental)" (Louis E. Johnson, George Henry Johnson) – 4:28
"Real Love" (Bryan Loren) – 4:37
"Dazed" (Louis E. Johnson, George Henry Johnson) - 4:24
"You Keep Me Comin' Back" (12" Special Remixed Version) (Ricky Smith, Leon Sylvers Jr, Dana Marshall, Wardell Potts Jr.) - 6:19
"Do You" (Henry George Johnson, Louis Johnson) - 3:24
"I Came Here to Party" (Terry Murphy, Pamela Phillips Oland, Wilmer Raglin Jr., Racine Sherman) - 4:14
"Kick It to the Curb" (12" version) (Irene Cara, Henry George Johnson) - 5:51

Disc 1, Tracks 1-4, 14 from Look Out for #1 (1976)
Disc 1, Tracks 5-7, 15-16 from Right on Time (1977)
Disc 1, Tracks 8-12 from Blam! (1978)
Disc 1, Track 13, Disc 2, Tracks 1-4 from Light Up the Night (1980)
Disc 2, Tracks 5-6 from Winners (1981)
Disc 2, Tracks 7-10 from Blast!: The Latest and the Greatest (1982)
Disc 2, Tracks 11-12, 17 from Kickin''' (1988)
Disc 2, Track 13-16 from Out of Control'' (1984)

References

2013 greatest hits albums
The Brothers Johnson albums